The 2018–19 Kansas State Wildcats women's basketball team represents Kansas State University in the 2018–19 NCAA Division I women's basketball season. The Wildcats were led by fifth-year head coach Jeff Mittie. They play their home games at Bramlage Coliseum in Manhattan, Kansas and were members of the Big 12 Conference. They finished the season 21–12, 11–7 in Big 12 play to finish in a tie for fourth place. They advanced to the semifinals of the Big 12 women's basketball tournament where they lost to Baylor. They received at-large bid of the NCAA women's basketball tournament as a 9th seed in the Albany Regional where they lost to Michigan in the first round.

Roster

Schedule and results 

|-
!colspan=9 style=| Exhibition

|-
!colspan=9 style=| Non-conference regular season

|-
!colspan=9 style=| Big 12 regular season

|-
!colspan=9 style=| Big 12 Women's Tournament

|-
!colspan=9 style=|

Rankings
2018–19 NCAA Division I women's basketball rankings

See also 
 2018–19 Kansas State Wildcats men's basketball team

References

External links
 Official Team Website

Kansas State Wildcats women's basketball seasons
Kansas State
Kansas State